Charles Hutchinson Gabriel (August 18, 1856 – September 14, 1932) was a writer of gospel songs and composer of gospel tunes. He is said to have written and/or composed between 7,000 and 8,000 songs, many of which are available in 21st century hymnals. He used several pseudonyms, including Charlotte G. Homer, H. A. Henry, and S. B. Jackson.

Life
Charles Hutchinson Gabriel was born in Wilton, Muscatine County, Iowa, and raised on a farm. His father led singing schools in their home, and young Charles developed an interest in music. It is said that he taught himself to play the family's reed organ. Even though he never had any formal training in music, he began to travel and lead his own shape note singing schools in various locations around the age of 17.

His musical talent was well recognized in his boyhood home of Wilton. There is one folklore story, that the pastor of the First Presbyterian Church of Wilton (Pastor Pollock or McAulay) once saw Gabriel walking in town early in the week. He asked Gabriel if he knew a good song to go along with his sermon. The pastor shared the sermon topic and by the end of the week the boy had written a song for that Sunday, words and music. The Rev. N. A. McAulay was a pastor at the Wilton church for many years, and it is also said that young Gabriel wrote the music for one of McAulay's songs. The song, "How Could it Be," was later published in Songs for Service, edited by Gabriel, with the music being credited to "Charles H. Marsh," possibly one of Gabriel's pseudonyms.

Eventually he served as music director at Grace Methodist Episcopal Church, San Francisco, California (1890-2). While working at Grace Church, he was asked to write a song for a mission celebration. He wrote "Send the Light," which became his first commercial song. He moved to Chicago, Illinois, and in 1912 he began working with Homer Rodeheaver's publishing company.

Gabriel was married twice, first to Fannie Woodhouse, which ended in divorce, and later to Amelia Moore. One child was born to each marriage.

He died in Hollywood, California. Gabriel wrote an autobiography titled Sixty Years of Gospel Song (Chicago, Illinois: Hope Publishing Company, undated). He was inducted into the Gospel Music Hall of Fame in 1982.

Songs

General
Gabriel edited 35 gospel song books, 8 Sunday school song books, seven books for male choruses, six books for ladies, ten children's song books, nineteen collections of anthems, 23 choir cantatas, 41 Christmas cantatas, 10 children's cantatas, and books on musical instruction.

Among these publications are:
Gospel Songs and Their Writers (Chicago, Illinois: The Rodeheaver Company, 1915)
The Singers and Their Songs (Chicago, Illinois: The Rodeheaver Company, 1916)
Church Music of Yesterday, To-Day and for To-Morrow (Chicago, Illinois: The Rodeheaver Company, 1921)
Golden Bells (Chicago, Illinois: The Rodeheaver Company, 1923) (music editor)
His "Dream of Fairyland" was an exceedingly successful children's cantata, and sold well for several years. He considered his best work to be a sacred cantata for adult voices: "Saul, King of Israel."
He also had an interest in military bands, and wrote marches, waltzes, etc., for bands.

Gospel Songs and Hymns
"Gospel songs" are not necessarily published in the main hymnals used in denominational worship (they are typically found in evangelical Protestantism and are less prevalent in more liturgical churches), but Diehl's index to denominational hymnals published from the 1890s to 1966 lists 37 tunes by Gabriel.

As a sample of Gabriel's vast output, below are the Gabriel tunes from three songbooks and two denominational hymnals. This list omits tunes attributed to names that are possible Gabriel pseudonyms but includes lyrics published by Gabriel under a known pseudonym. Note that none of these sources published one of Gabriel's most popular songs, "Brighten the Corner Where You Are" (1913). 

The song books referenced in the table are as follows:
(A) Alexander, Charles M. (ed.) Alexander's Gospel Songs. Philadelphia: Westminster Press, 1908
(R) Rodeheaver, Homer and B. D. Ackley, eds. Great Revival Hymns. Chicago: Rodeheaver-Ackley Co., 1911.
(C) Bowen, C. A. (ed.) The Cokesbury Worship Hymnal. Nashville: Abingdon-Cokesbury Press, 1938.
(B) Sims, Walter Hines. Baptist Hymnal. Nashville: Convention Press, 1956.
(L) Church of Jesus Christ of Latter-day Saints.  Hymns of The Church of Jesus Christ of Latter-day Saints. Salt Lake City: Intellectual Reserve, Inc., 1985.

References

Sources 
 Terry York, "Charles Hutchinson Gabriel: Composer, Author, and Editor in the Gospel Tradition" (Unpublished DMA diss., New Orleans Baptist Theological Seminary, 1985).
 Kevin Mungons and Douglas Yeo, Homer Rodeheaver and the Rise of the Gospel Music Industry (Urbana: University of Illinois Press, 2021).

External links
 
 Famous Iowans: Charles Gabriel by Tom Longden
 

1856 births
1932 deaths
American male composers
American composers
American Christian hymnwriters
Composers of Christian music
Gospel music composers
People from Wilton, Iowa